RMD Engineering College is an engineering college in Tamil Nadu, India, funded by the Sri Swaminatha Naidu Educational Trust.

The college, opened in 2001 with six departments: IT, CSE, EEE, ECE, MBA and MCA with about 240 students in Kavaripettai Next to RMK College Campus which is also a sister Institute under RMK Group of institution.

The college is a Green Campus with river and located about 35 km from Chennai in the National Highway NH5 in the Chennai - Nellore-Kolkata Highway. The College is about a kilometer from Kavaraipettai railway station.

RMD College is a Co-Educational Institution specializing in Engineering and Technology plus specialized post-graduate programs in Computer Applications, Business Administration and Computer Science & Engineering.

Sister Concerns
 RMK Engineering College
 RMK Matriculation School
 Sri Durga Devi Polytechnic
 RMK Residential School
 RMK College of Engineering & Technology

Departments

 Department of Information Science & Technology
 Department of Computer Science & Engineering
 Department of Electronics & Communication Engineering
 Department of Electrical & Electronics Engineering
 Department of Electronics & Instrumentation Engineering
 Department of Computer Applications
 Department of Management Studies

See also
 RMK Engineering College
 RMK Residential School
 RMK College of Engineering & Technology

External links
RMD Engineering College Official Site

Engineering colleges in Tamil Nadu
Education in Tiruvallur district
Educational institutions established in 2001
2001 establishments in Tamil Nadu